In logic, counterinduction is a measure that helps to call something into question by developing something against which it can be compared. Paul Feyerabend argued for counterinduction as a way to test unchallenged scientific theories; unchallenged simply because there are no structures within the scientific paradigm to challenge itself (See Crotty, 1998 p. 39). For instance, Feyerabend is quoted as saying the following:

"Therefore, the first step in our criticism of customary concepts and customary reactions is to step outside the circle and either to invent a new conceptual system, for example, a new theory, that clashes with the most carefully established observational results and confounds the most plausible theoretical principles, or to import such a system from the outside science, from religion, from mythology, from the ideas of incompetents, or the ramblings of madmen." (Feyerabend, 1993, pp. 52-3)

This gets into the pluralistic methodology that Feyerabend espouses that will help support counterinductive methods. Paul Feyerabend's anarchist theory popularized the notion of counterinduction.

Most of the time when counterinduction is mentioned, it is not presented as a valid rule.  Instead, it is given as a refutation of Max Black's proposed inductive justification of induction, since the counterinductive justification of counterinduction  is formally identical to the inductive justification of induction. For further information, see Problem of induction.

See also
 A priori and a posteriori
 Abductive reasoning
 Bayesian inference
 Hasty generalization
 Justified true belief
 Law of large numbers
 Solomonoff's theory of inductive inference

References

Inductive fallacies